Kim Hye-yoon (born November 10, 1996) is a South Korean actress and model. She first became known through her portrayal as Kang Ye-seo in JTBC's television series Sky Castle (2018–2019) and received her first leading role with MBC's Extraordinary You (2019).

Career

2013-2018: Career beginnings
Kim Hye-yoon debuted as an actress with 2013 KBS2 TV Novel's Samsaengi, as the teenage era of a supporting character. After landing a memorable role in 2014 OCN's crime thriller Bad Guys, Kim focused on her studies and only made guest appearances for several dramas, as she had received a full scholarship in 2015 to Konkuk University, one of Korea's leading universities. She majored in film studies and some of her works were featured at various student film festivals.

2019-present: Rising popularity
Leading up to her college graduation in February 2019, Kim began auditioning for bigger roles, including for JTBC's satire drama Sky Castle. The massive success of the series, along with her distinctive role as an ambitious and unfriendly but ladylike high school girl, launched her to stardom and won her the 55th Baeksang Arts Awards for Best New Actress.

In 2019, Kim starred as the protagonist for the first time with MBC's school fantasy Extraordinary You, based on the hit Daum webtoon July Found by Chance. She received further recognition, winning both New and Excellence Actress at the MBC Drama Awards.

Kim received her first leading role in film with 2020 production The Girl on a Bulldozer. In the same year, she also confirmed to star in the 2021 pre-produced JTBC series Snowdrop, in which she reunited with the production team of hit drama Sky Castle.

Near the completion of Snowdrop filming process, Kim received the offer to star in tvN's 2021 historical procedural Secret Royal Inspector & Joy. The drama premiered ahead of Snowdrop.

In 2022, Kim performance as Goo Hye-young in the mystery drama film The Girl on a Bulldozer has received critical acclaim and garnered her several awards in prestigious show such as the Blue Dragon Awards and Grand Bell Awards for Best New Actress. She also received Rising Star Asia Award in New York Asian Film Festival as well as Best New Actor/Actress in Korean Film Producers Association Awards.

Filmography

Film

Television series

Web series

Television shows

Music video appearances

Ambassadorship

Awards and nominations

References

External links

 
 
 
 

1996 births
Living people
People from Seongnam
Konkuk University alumni
21st-century South Korean actresses
South Korean film actresses
South Korean television actresses
IHQ (company) artists
Best New Actress Paeksang Arts Award (television) winners
Best New Actress Blue Dragon Film Awards winners